The Greek Orthodox Patriarchate of Antioch, also known as the Antiochian Orthodox Church and legally as the Greek Orthodox Patriarchate of Antioch and All the East, is an autocephalous Greek Orthodox church within the wider communion of Eastern Orthodox Christianity and one of the historic Pentarchy. Headed by the Greek Orthodox patriarch of Antioch, it considers itself the successor to the Christian community founded in Antioch by the Apostles Peter and Paul.

Background

The seat of the patriarchate was formerly Antioch, in what is now Turkey. However, in the 14th century, it was moved to Damascus, modern-day Syria. Its traditional territory includes Syria, Lebanon, Iraq, Kuwait, the Arab countries of the Persian Gulf, and also parts of Turkey. Its territory formerly included the Church of Cyprus until the latter became autocephalous in 431. Both the Orthodox Churches of Antioch and Cyprus are members of the Middle East Council of Churches.

Its North American branch is autonomous, although the Holy Synod of Antioch still appoints its head bishop, chosen from a list of three candidates nominated in the North American archdiocese. Its Australasia and Oceania branch is the largest in terms of geographic area due to the relatively large size of Australia and the large portion of the Pacific Ocean that the archdiocese covers.

The head of the Orthodox Church of Antioch is called Patriarch. The present Greek Orthodox patriarch of Antioch is John X (Yazigi), who presided over the Archdiocese of Western and Central Europe (2008–2013). He was elected as primate of the Greek Orthodox Patriarchate of Antioch and All the East as John X of Antioch (Yazigi) on December 17, 2012. He succeeded Ignatius IV who had died on December 5, 2012. Membership statistics are not available, but may be as high as 1,100,000 in Syria and 400,000 in Lebanon where they make up 8% of the population or 20% of Christians who make up 39-41% of Lebanon. The seat of the patriarch in Damascus is the Mariamite Cathedral of Damascus.

The Greek Orthodox Church of Antioch is one of several churches that lay claim to be the canonical incumbent of the ancient see of Antioch. The Syriac Orthodox Church makes the same claim, as do the Syriac Catholic Church, the Maronite Church, and the Melkite Greek Catholic Church; the latter three are Eastern Catholic Churches in full communion with the Holy See and mutually recognize each other as holding authentic patriarchates, being part of the same Catholic communion. Their fellow Catholic particular church, the Latin Church, also appointed titular patriarchs for many centuries, until the office was left vacant in 1953 and abolished in 1964 with all claims renounced.

History and cultural legacy

Pauline Greco-Semitic roots

According to Luke the Evangelist- himself a Greco-Syrian member of that community:

St Peter and St Paul the Apostle are considered the cofounders of the Patriarchate of Antioch, the former being its first bishop. When Peter left Antioch, Evodios and Ignatius took over the charge of the Patriarchate. Both Evodios and Ignatius died as martyrs under Roman persecution.

Hellenistic Judaism and the Judeo-Greek "wisdom" literature popular in the late Second Temple era amongst both Hellenized Rabbinical Jews (known as Mityavnim in Hebrew) and gentile Greek proselyte converts to mainstream Judaism played an important part in the formation of the Melkite-Antiochian Greek Orthodox tradition. Some typically Grecian "Ancient Synagogal" priestly rites and hymns have survived partially to the present in the distinct church service, architecture and iconography of the Melkite Greek Orthodox and Greek Catholic communities of the Hatay Province of Southern Turkey, Syria and Lebanon.

Some historians believe that a sizable proportion of the Hellenized Jewish communities and most gentile Greco-Macedonian settlers in Southern Turkey (Antioch, Alexandretta and neighboring cities) and Syria/Lebanon – the former being called "Hellenistai" in the Acts – converted progressively to the Greco-Roman branch of Christianity that eventually constituted the "Melkite" (or "Imperial") Hellenistic Churches in Western Asia and North Africa:

Acts 6 points to the problematic cultural tensions between the Hellenized Jews and Greek-speaking Judeo-Christians centered around Antioch and related Cilician, Southern-Anatolian and Syrian "Diasporas" and (the generally more conservative) Aramaic-speaking Jewish converts to Christianity based in Jerusalem and neighboring Israeli towns:

"There is neither Jew nor Greek"
These ethno-cultural and social tensions were eventually surmounted by the emergence of a new, typically Antiochian Greek doctrine (doxa) spearheaded by Paul (himself a Hellenized Cilician Jew) and his followers be they 1. Established, autochthonous Hellenized Cilician-Western Syrian Jews (themselves descendants of Babylonian and ‘Asian’ Jewish migrants who had adopted early on various elements of Greek culture and civilization while retaining a generally conservative attachment to Jewish laws & traditions), 2. Heathen, ‘Classical’ Greeks, Greco-Macedonian and Greco-Syrian gentiles, and 3. the local, autochthonous descendants of Greek or Greco-Syrian converts to mainstream Judaism – known as “Proselytes” (Greek: προσήλυτος/proselytes or ‘newcomers to Israel’) and Greek-speaking Jews born of mixed marriages.

Paul's efforts were probably facilitated by the arrival of a fourth wave of Greek-speaking newcomers to Cilicia/Southern Turkey and Northwestern Syria: Cypriot and ‘Cyrenian’ (Libyan) Jewish migrants of non-Egyptian North African Jewish origin and gentile Roman settlers from Italy- many of whom already spoke fluent Koine Greek and/or sent their children to Greco-Syrian schools. Some scholars believe that, at the time, these Cypriot and Cyrenian North African Jewish migrants were generally less affluent than the autochthonous Cilician-Syrian Jews and practiced a more ‘liberal’ form of Judaism, more propitious for the formation of a new canon:

These subtle, progressive socio-cultural shifts are somehow summarized succinctly in Chapter 3 of the Epistle to the Galatians:

Dual self-designation: "Melkites" and "Eastern Romans"
The unique combination of ethnocultural traits inhered from the fusion of a Greek cultural base, Hellenistic Judaism and Roman civilization gave birth to the distinctly Antiochian “Eastern Mediterranean-Roman” Christian traditions of Cilicia (Southeastern Turkey) and Syria/Lebanon:

Some of the typically Antiochian ancient liturgical traditions of the community rooted in Hellenistic Judaism and, more generally, Second Temple Greco-Jewish Septuagint culture, were expunged progressively in the late medieval and modern eras by both Phanariot European-Greek (Ecumenical Patriarch of Constantinople) and Vatican (Roman Catholic) theologians who sought to 'bring back' Levantine Greek Orthodox and Greek-Catholic communities into the European Christian fold.

But members of the community in Southern Turkey, Syria and Lebanon still call themselves Rūm (روم) which means "Eastern Romans" or "Asian Greeks" in Arabic. In that particular context, the term "Rūm" is used in preference to "Yūnāniyyūn" (يونانيون) which means "European Greeks" or "Ionians" in Biblical Hebrew (borrowed from Old Persian Yavan = Greece) and Classical Arabic. Members of the community also call themselves 'Melkites', which literally means "monarchists" or "supporters of the emperor" in Semitic languages - a reference to their past allegiance to Greco-Macedonian, Roman and Byzantine imperial rule. But, in the modern era, the term tends to be more commonly used by followers of the Greek Catholic Church of Antioch and Alexandria and Jerusalem.

Interaction with other non-Muslim ethnocultural minorities
Following the fall of the Turkish Ottoman Empire and the Tsarist Russian Empire (long the protector of Greek-Orthodox minorities in the Levant), and the ensuing rise of French colonialism, communism, Islamism and Israeli nationalism, some members of the Greek Orthodox Church of Antioch embraced secularism and/or Arab Nationalism as a way to modernize and "secularize" the newly formed nation-states of Northern Syria and Lebanon, and thus provide a viable "alternative" to political Islam, communism and Jewish nationalism (viewed as ideologies potentially exclusive of Byzantine Christian minorities).

This often led to interfaith conflicts with the Maronite Church in Lebanon, notably regarding Palestinian refugees after 1948 and 1967. Various (sometimes secular) intellectuals with a Greek Orthodox Antiochian background played an important role in the development of Baathism, the most prominent being Michel Aflaq, one of the founders of the movement.

Abraham Dimitri Rihbany
In the early 20th century (notably during World War I), Lebanese-American writers of Greek-Orthodox Antiochian background such as Abraham Dimitri Rihbany, known as Abraham Mitrie Rihbany (a convert to Presbyterianism), popularized the notion of studying ancient Greco-Semitic culture to better understand the historic and ethnocultural context of the Christian Gospels: his original views were developed in a series of articles for The Atlantic Monthly, and in 1916 published in book form as The Syrian Christ.

At a time when most of the Arab world area was ruled by the Ottoman Empire, France and Britain, Rihbany called for US military intervention in the Holy Land to fend off Ottoman Pan-Islamism, French colonialism, Soviet Communism and radical Zionist enterprises- all viewed as potentially detrimental to Christian minorities.

Administration and structure
The administration and structure of the Antiochian See are governed by statutes.

The Patriarch

The Patriarch is elected by the Holy Synod from amongst the metropolitans who compose it. The Patriarch presides the Holy Synod and executes its decisions. He also acts as metropolitan of the Archdiocese of Antioch and Damascus.

The current Patriarch, John X (Yazigi), was elected on December 17, 2012, succeeding to Metropolitan Saba Esber, who had been elected locum tenens on December 7, 2012, following Ignatius IV (Hazim)'s death.

Archdioceses and metropolitans

There are at present 22 archdioceses, each headed by a metropolitan.

Western Asia
Archdiocese of Antioch and Damascus: Patriarchal archdiocese
Archdiocese of Akkar and Dependencies (Wadi al-Nasara, Safita and Tartus): Basilios Mansour (2008–present)
Archdiocese of Aleppo (Beroea) and Alexandretta: Ephreim Maalouli (2021–present)
Archdiocese of Beirut and Exarchate of Phœnicia: Elias Audi (1980–present)
Archdiocese of Baghdad, Kuwait and Dependencies: Ghattas Hazim (2014–present)
Archdiocese of Bosra, Hauran and Jabal al-Arab: Saba Esber (1999–present)
Archdiocese of Byblos and Batroun: Siluan Muci (2018–present)
Archdiocese of Hama (Epiphania) and Exarchate of North Syria: Nicholas Baalbaki (2017–present)
Archdiocese of Homs (Emesa): George Abu Zakhem (1999–present)
Archdiocese of Latakia (Laodicea ad Mare) and Exarchate of Theodorias: Athanasius Fahd (2018–present)
Archdiocese of Tripoli and Koura: Ephraim Kyriakos (2009–present)
Archdiocese of Tyre and Sidon: Elias Kfoury (1995–present)
Archdiocese of Zahleh and Baalbek (Heliopolis): Antonios El Soury (14 Nov 2015–present)

Asia and Oceania
Archdiocese of Australia, New Zealand and the Philippines: Basilios Qoudsiah (2017–present)

Europe

Archdiocese of the British Isles and Ireland: Silouan Oner (2015–present)
Archdiocese of France, Western and Southern Europe: Ignatius Alhoushi (2013–present)
Archdiocese of Germany and Central Europe: Isaac Barakat (2013–present)

The Americas
Archdiocese of North America (Englewood, New Jersey); Metropolitan of New York and All North America: Joseph Al-Zehlaoui (2014–present)
Diocese of Charleston, Oakland and Mid-Atlantic: Thomas Joseph (2004–present)
Diocese of Eagle River and the Northwest: vacant
Diocese of Los Angeles and the West: vacant
Diocese of New York and Washington, D.C.: Metropolitical diocese
Diocese of Miami and the Southeast: Nicholas Ozone (2017–present)
Diocese of Ottawa, Eastern Canada and Upstate New York: Alexander Mufarrij (2004–present)
Diocese of Toledo and the Mid-West: Anthony Michaels (2011–present)
Diocese of Wichita and Mid-America: Basil Essey (2004–present), Titular Bishop of Anfeh (1992–2003)
Diocese of Worcester and New England: John Abdallah (2011–present)
Archdiocese of Buenos Aires and All Argentina: Jacob Khoury (elected 2018)
Archdiocese of Mexico, Venezuela, Central America and the Caribbean: Ignatius Samaan (2017–present)
Archdiocese of Santiago and All Chile: Sergios Abad (1996–present), Bishop of Salamias and Patriarchal Auxiliary for Chile (1988–1996)
Archdiocese of São Paulo and All Brazil: Damaskinos Mansour (1997–present)

Titular dioceses and bishops
Diocese of Shahba: Niphon Saykali (1988–), elevated to archbishop in 2009 and elevated to metropolitan in 2014, Representative of the Patriarch of Antioch and All the East at the Patriarch of Moscow and All Russia
Diocese of Darayya: Moussa Khoury (1995–), Patriarchal Assistant – Damascus
Diocese of Saidnaya: Luka Khoury (1999–), Patriarchal Assistant – Damascus
Diocese of Banias: Demetrios Charbak (2011–), Auxiliary Bishop in Safita, Archdiocese of Akkar
Diocese of Arthoussa: Elias Toumeh (2011–), Auxiliary Bishop in Marmarita, Archdiocese of Akkar
Diocese of Zabadani: Constantine Kayal (2011–), Abbot of St Elias – Shwayya Patriarchal Monastery
Diocese of Palmyra: Youhanna Haikal (2011–), Auxiliary Bishop in the Archdiocese of Germany and Central Europe
Diocese of Edessa: Romanos Daoud (2011–), Auxiliary Bishop in the Archdiocese of São Paulo and Brazil
Diocese of the Emirates: Gregorios Khoury-Abdallah (2014-), Assistant Bishop to the Patriarch
Diocese of Erzurum: Qays Sadek (2014-), Assistant Bishop to the Patriarch
Diocese of Resafa: Youhanna Batash (2017-)
Diocese of Apamea: Theodore Ghandour (2017-)
Diocese of Diyarbakır: Paul Yazigi (2021-)

Retired bishops
Archdiocese of Byblos and Batroun: Georges Khodr (1970-2018)
Diocese of Jableh: Demetrios Khoury (1995–2003)
Diocese of Yabroud: Athanasius Saliba (1979–)

Daughter churches
Church of Constantinople : Granted autocephaly in A.D. 381 in Council of Constantinople and gained dignity of Patriarchate in A.D. 451 in Council of Chalcedon.
Church of Cyprus: Granted autocephaly by the Church of Antioch in A.D. 431.
Church of Georgia: Granted autocephaly by the Church of Antioch in A.D. 486.
Church of Imereti and Abkhazia: Granted autocephaly by the Church of Antioch in the 1470s, but suppressed by the Russian Empire in 1814 and continued to be a dependency of the Church of Moscow and all Russia until 1917 when it was reunited with Church of Georgia.
Church of Jerusalem: Originally Bishopric of Cæsarea, gained dignity of Patriarchate in A.D. 451 in Council of Chalcedon with territory carved from Patriarchate of Antioch.

See also

Eastern Orthodoxy in Syria
Antiochian Greeks
Antiochian Orthodox Archdiocese of North America
Early Christianity
Eastern Orthodox Church
Greek Orthodox Church
Hellenistic Judaism
List of Greek Orthodox Patriarchs of Antioch – 518 to present day
List of Orthodox Churches
List of Patriarchs of Antioch – to 518
Eastern Orthodoxy in Lebanon
Eastern Orthodoxy in Turkey
Pentarchy
Saint John of Damascus
Saint Joseph of Damascus
Saint Raphael of Brooklyn
List of Greek Orthodox Antiochian Churches in Europe

References

Sources

External links

 
 “Christian Church to be Filled by a Damascus Preacher” (New York Times, September 15, 1895)
 OrthodoxWiki – Church of Antioch

 
Greek Orthodoxy in Syria
Greek Orthodoxy in Lebanon
Greek Orthodoxy in Turkey
Members of the World Council of Churches
Eastern Orthodox Church bodies in Asia
Organizations based in Damascus